Sibylla of Acerra (1153–1205) was Queen of Sicily as the wife of King Tancred. She was regent in 1194 for their son, King William III. She was the sister of Count Richard of Acerra.

Life
Tancred was always in a struggle with his aunt Empress Constance and her husband Emperor Henry VI who had been claiming the Kingdom of Sicily since Tancred's accession. In 1191 Henry attempted to invade Sicily but failed and retreated, while Constance was left behind and captured. Tancred initially placed Constance at Palermo under the supervision of Queen Sibylla, with Constance eating with Sibylla and sleeping in her bedroom. Sibylla strongly opposed Tancred honoring Constance, believing this would implicitly acknowledge the claim of the latter. Finding the local populace was sympathetic with Constance with whom she once quarreled, Sibylla suggested Constance be put to death, but Tancred, worrying this would harm his popularity, and viewing Constance-as-hostage as a chance to force Henry into a truce, did not agree. So as suggested by Tancred, she went for a discussion with Chancellor Matthew d'Ajello on where to imprison Constance, and in her presence Matthew wrote a letter managing to persuade Tancred to imprison the empress in the Castel dell'Ovo at Naples, a castle on an island and surrounded by water. However, under pressure from Pope Celestine III, Tancred had to send Constance to Rome in exchange for recognition from the Pope; on the way, Constance was freed by German soldiers, in the summer of 1192.

When Emperor Henry VI crossed the Straits of Messina in Autumn 1194, Queen Sibylla, now regent, negotiated an agreement whereby the young William III, who had been whisked off to safety, should retain the County of Lecce.

Sibylla attended the coronation of Henry in the Cathedral of Palermo. Days after this event, Queen Sibylla and her supporters Nicholas of Ajello son of Matthew, Archbishop of Salerno, and Margaritus of Brindisi, were arrested and imprisoned in Germany with her son and daughters. She managed to escape to France while Pope Innocent III petitioned Henry for her release. Her brother Richard was hanged by Henry in revenge for the capture of Constance.

Issue
Roger III, duke of Apulia and king of Sicily
William III, duke of Apulia and king of Sicily
Elvira, countess of Lecce after the death of her brother; married firstly Walter III of Brienne, secondly Giacomo Sanseverino, Count of Tricario, and thirdly Tigrini Guidi, Count of Modigliano (or Count Palatine in Tuscany?)
Constance, married Pietro Ziani, later Doge of Venice
Medania
Valdrada, married Giacomo Tiepolo, Doge of Venice

References

Sources
Alio, Jacqueline. Queens of Sicily 1061-1266. Trinacria: New York City, 2018.
Norwich, John Julius. The Kingdom in the Sun 1130-1194. Longman: London, 1970.
Matthew, Donald. The Norman Kingdom of Sicily. Cambridge University Press: 1992.

1153 births
1205 deaths
Regents of Sicily
People from Acerra
Royal consorts of Sicily
12th-century women rulers
12th-century Italian women
Italo-Normans
Princesses of Taranto
Women in medieval European warfare
Women in 12th-century warfare
Women in war in Italy
Queen mothers